Gigantes de Guyana is a basketball club based in Puerto Ordaz, Bolívar State, Venezuela that plays in the Venezuelan SuperLiga. Established in 2008, the team's home games are played at Hermanas Gonzalez Gymnasium where there is capacity for 3,000 people.

The Gigantes had their most successful season in 2020, when they finished as runners-up of the SuperLiga behind Spartans Distrito Capital, who won the finals 3–1.

Honours
Venezuelan SuperLiga
Runners-up (1): 2020

External links
Official site  (in Spanish)

Basketball teams established in 2008
Basketball teams in Venezuela
Sport in Bolívar (state)
Ciudad Guayana
2008 establishments in Venezuela